Wish Bone is the third studio album by Danish recording artist Oh Land, released on 16 September 2013 by Tusk or Tooth and A:larm Music. The album features production by Oh Land herself, along with David Andrew Sitek of TV on the Radio, Dan Carey and Grant "WNDRBRD" Michaels. It was preceded by the singles "Renaissance Girls" and "Pyromaniac".

Background and release
In 2012, Oh Land announced that she was developing new music in the studio.

On 10 July 2013, the track "My Boxer" premiered on Spin.com as the first taste of the album. "Renaissance Girls" was released as the album's official lead single in Denmark on 20 May 2013 and in the United States on 6 August. The accompanying music video debuted on 6 August 2013 and features Oh Land, along with four backing dancers, dancing in an empty warehouse. "Pyromaniac" was released on 2 September 2013 as the second single from the album.

The New York Times featured Wish Bone on its Press Play blog, previewing several of the tracks on the website.

Track listing

Personnel
Credits adapted from the liner notes of Wish Bone.

 Nanna Øland Fabricius – vocals ; vocal arrangements ; instruments ; production ; executive producer
 b14 – graphic design
 Owen Beverly – guitar, engineering 
 Dan Carey – engineering, mixing, production 
 Asger Carlsen – cover photo
 Vincent Chauncey – French horn 
 Danny Cheung – engineering 
 Andrew Dunn – trombone 
 Josh Edmondson – additional engineering 
 Katrine Muff Enevoldsen – choir singer 
 Bendt Fabricius – harp and choir arrangement 
 Steve Fallone – mastering
 Matty Green – mixing 
 Eske Kath – Wish Bone font, paintings
 Dana Leong – trombone 
 Farra Mathews – executive production
 Nathaniel Morton – drums 

 Anna Mose – choir singer 
 Tore Nissen – engineering, mixing 
 Carolina Parra – piano 
 David Poe – guitar 
 Andros Rodriguez – engineering ; mixing 
 Maylen Rusti – choir singer 
 Michael Shobe – trumpet ; brass arrangement 
 Todd Simon – brass 
 David Andrew Sitek – instruments, production ; mixing 
 Zeph Sowers – engineering ; mixing 
 David Stoller – engineering 
 Lillian Törnqvist – harp 
 Qarin Wikström – choir singer 
 WNDRBRD – engineering, production 
 Sophie Ziedoy – choir singer

Charts

Release history

References

2013 albums
Albums produced by Dan Carey (record producer)
Albums produced by Dave Sitek
Oh Land albums